Rollinia rufinervis is a species of plant in the Annonaceae family. It is endemic too Colombia.

References

rufinervis
Endemic flora of Colombia
Data deficient plants
Taxonomy articles created by Polbot
Taxobox binomials not recognized by IUCN